Vladimir is a city and the administrative center of Vladimir Oblast, Russia, located on the Klyazma River,  east of Moscow. It is served by a railway and the M7 motorway. Population:

History
Vladimir was one of the medieval capitals of Russia, with significant buildings surviving from the 12th century. Two of its Russian Orthodox cathedrals, a monastery, and associated buildings have been designated as among the White Monuments of Vladimir and Suzdal, a UNESCO World Heritage Site. In the past, the city was also known as Vladimir-on-Klyazma and Vladimir-Zalessky, to distinguish it from another Vladimir in Volhynia (modern Ukraine).

Foundation

The founding date of Vladimir is disputed between 990 and 1108. In the Novgorod First Chronicle, Vladimir is mentioned under the year 1108, and during the Soviet period, this year was decreed to be its foundation year with the view that attributes the founding of the city, and its name, to Vladimir Monomakh, who inherited the region as part of the Rostov-Suzdal Principality in 1093. It is named there as Volodimer. The chronicles also describe how inhabitants from neighbouring towns, namely Suzdal and Rostov, alluded to Vladimir as a young town. Accordingly, the 850th anniversary of the city foundation was celebrated in 1958, with many monuments from the celebrations adorning the city; this enabled Nikita Khrushchev, who recently took power in the Soviet Union, to link his administration with early Russian history.

In the 1990s, a new opinion developed that the city was instead founded in 990 by Vladimir the Great, with local historians supporting the alternative foundation date and citing various chronicle sources. Scholars reinterpreted certain passages in the Hypatian Codex, which mentions that the region was visited by Vladimir the Great, the "father" of Russian Orthodoxy, in 990, so as to move the city foundation date to that year. The Charter of Vladimir, the basic law of the city passed in 2005, explicitly mentions 990 as the date of the city's foundation. The city administration officially recognizes 990 as the foundation date.

Vladimir-Suzdal

The city's most historically significant events occurred after the turn of the 12th century. Serving its original purpose as a defensive outpost for the Rostov-Suzdal Principality, Vladimir had little political or military influence throughout the reign of Vladimir Monomakh (1113–1125), or his son Yury Dolgoruky ("Far-Reaching") (1154–1157).

Under Dolgoruky's son, Andrey Bogolyubsky (1157–1175) (also known as Andrew the Pious), the city became the center of the Vladimir-Suzdal Principality. It had a Golden Age, which lasted until the Mongol invasion of Rus' in 1237. During this time, Vladimir enjoyed immense growth and prosperity. Andrey oversaw the building of the city's Golden Gates and the Dormition Cathedral. In 1164, Andrey attempted to establish a new metropolitanate in Vladimir, separate from that of Kiev. He was rebuffed by the Patriarch of Constantinople.

Scores of Russian, German, and Georgian masons worked on Vladimir's white stone cathedrals, monastery, towers, and palaces. Unlike any other northern buildings, their exterior was elaborately carved with high relief stone sculptures. Only three of these edifices stand today: the Dormition Cathedral, the Cathedral of Saint Demetrius, and the Golden Gate. They are included among the White Monuments of Vladimir and Suzdal, designated as a UNESCO World Heritage Site.
During Andrey's reign, a royal palace in Bogolyubovo was built, as well as the world-famous Church of the Intercession on the Nerl, now considered one of the jewels of ancient Russian architecture. Andrey was assassinated at his palace at Bogolyubovo in 1175.

Vladimir was besieged by the Mongol-Tatars of the Golden Horde under Batu Khan. It was finally overrun on February 8, 1238. A great fire destroyed thirty-two limestone buildings on the first day alone, while the grand prince's family perished in a church where they sought refuge from the flames. The grand prince escaped, but was killed at the Battle of the Sit River the following month.

Grand Duchy of Moscow

After the Mongols, Vladimir never fully recovered. The most important Rus prince (usually the Prince of Moscow, but sometimes a Tver or another principality) was styled the Grand Prince of Vladimir, but the title had become an honorific symbol of majesty. From 1299 to 1325, the city was seat of the metropolitans of Kiev and All Rus', until Metropolitan Peter moved the See to Moscow in 1325.

The Grand Princes of Vladimir were originally crowned in Vladimir's Assumption Cathedral, but when Moscow superseded Vladimir in the 14th Century as the seat of the Grand Prince, the Assumption Cathedral in the Moscow Kremlin became the site of their coronation. The Moscow cathedral was loosely copied by the Italian architect Aristotele Fioravanti from Vladimir's original.

After the rise of Moscow, Grand Princes of Moscow continued to build several new churches in Vladimir. Notable examples include the Annunciation Church at Snovitsy (ca. 1501), three kilometers northwest of the city, and a church in the Knyaginin Nunnery (ca. 1505), which today includes murals dating from 1648.

Imperial Russia

Remains of the prince-saint Alexander Nevsky were kept in the ancient Nativity Abbey of Vladimir until 1703, when Peter the Great had them transferred to the Monastery (now Lavra) of Alexander Nevsky in St. Petersburg. The Nativity Church (built from 1191 to 1196) collapsed several years later, after workmen tried to fashion more windows in its walls in an effort to brighten the interior.

Vladimir was separated from Moscow Governorate and made the center of a new  by a ukase of Catherine the Great in 1778.

In the years 1838-1840, Alexander Herzen was exiled in Vladimir, passing through the city on the infamous Vladimirka.

In December 1858 the city began to operate telegraph.  On June 14, 1861, the  began to operate through Vladimir.  In 1866, construction of a running water supply was completed, with telephone lines being put up in 1887 and the first electrical power lines on December 5, 1908.

In November 29, 1898 Vladimir provincial scientific archival commission was established.

Soviet Union
After the establishment of Soviet power, many streets were renamed in Vladimir; most of the parish churches were closed and condemned to be demolished.

In the first decades of Soviet rule industrialization occurred in Vladimir.  On January 14, 1929, the Vladimir Governorate was abolished and the city became part of the newly formed Ivanovo Industrial Oblast.

On August 14, 1944, Vladimir became the administrative center of a new Vladimir Oblast carved from Ivanovo Oblast. In 1950 from the basis of the teachers' institute the Vladimir Pedagogical Institute was created. On November 5, 1952 the first trolleybus line began to operate in the city.

The monuments are located in three cities—Vladimir, Suzdal and Gus-Khrustalny—as well as villages of Bogolyubovo and Kideksha.

Architecture of the Soviet period is present in structures such as  building complexes and polytechnic colleges, the Torpedo Stadium (built 1952), a reinforced concrete arch bridge over the river Klyaz'ma (1960), the Hotel Vladimir (1956), the Drama Theatre (1971) and others. In 1971 the city was awarded the Order of Red Banner of Labor.

Administrative and municipal status
Vladimir is the administrative center of the oblast. Within the framework of administrative divisions, it is, together with seventeen rural localities, incorporated as the City of Vladimir—an administrative unit with the status equal to that of the districts. As a municipal division, the City of Vladimir is incorporated as Vladimir Urban Okrug.

Economy and military
Vladimir is home to several electrical and chemical factories, several food processing plants and two large thermal power stations. Tourism related to the historical sites is a major contributor to the city's economy.

The headquarters of the 27th Guards Rocket Army of the Strategic Missile Troops is located in the city. During the Cold War, Vladimir was host to the Dobrynskoye air force base.

Transportation

Since 1861, there has been a railway connection between Vladimir and Moscow. Vladimir is also linked to Moscow and Nizhny Novgorod by the M7 highway. Local transport includes buses, trolleybuses, fixed-route minivans, and taxis.

Vladimir bus service links the city to all the district centers of Vladimir Oblast, as well as Moscow, Ivanovo, Kostroma, Nizhny Novgorod, Ryazan, Yaroslavl and other cities.

At least 20 pairs of long-distance trains pass daily through Vladimir station, giving Vladimir year-round direct rail links to Moscow (Kursk Station), St. Petersburg and Nizhny Novgorod. Since the summer of 2010 Vladimir (on the Nizhny Novgorod line) is a stopping point for the "Peregrine Falcon" high-speed train.

Vladimir also possesses a developed suburban rail system. It was the only city in Russia with concurrent commuter trains two Russian cities with subways.
The city is served by the Semyazino Airport 5 km west of the city center.

Gallery

Population
Population:

Climate
Vladimir experiences a humid continental climate (Köppen climate classification Dfb) with long, cold winters and short, warm summers.

Sightseeing
Modern Vladimir is a part of the Golden Ring of ancient Russian cities and a popular tourist destination. Its three chief monuments, White Monuments of Vladimir and Suzdal, inscribed by UNESCO on the World Heritage List, are the following:
The magnificent five-domed Dormition Cathedral was designed as the burial place of grand princes and dedicated to the holy icon the Theotokos of Vladimir, which had been brought to the city by  Andrey Bogolyubsky. The cathedral was constructed in 1158–1160, expanded in 1185–1189, and painted by the great Andrei Rublev and Daniil Chyorny in 1408. In 1810, a lofty bell-tower was added in Neoclassical style.
The helmet-domed Cathedral of Saint Demetrius was built in 1194–1197 as a private chapel of Vsevolod the Big Nest in the courtyard of his palace and was consecrated to his holy patron, St. Demetrius.  For all its formal unity, the cathedral represents an international project of Russian and Byzantine masters, Friedrich Barbarossa's masons, and carvers sent by Queen Tamar of Georgia.
The Golden Gate, originally a tower over the city's main gate, was built in 1158–1164. The gate acquired its present form after having been reconstructed in the late 18th century, to prevent the dilapidated structure from tumbling down.

Other remarkable monuments of pre-Mongol Russian architecture are scattered in the vicinity. For more information on them, see Suzdal, Yuriev-Polsky, Bogolyubovo, and Kideksha.

Education
Vladimir is the site of the following education establishments:
Vladimir State University
Vladimir branch of the Russian Academy of National Economy and Public Administration
Vladimir branch of Financial University under the Government of the Russian Federation
Vladimir branch of the Russian University of Cooperation
Vladimir Law Institute under the Ministry of Justice
Vladimir Business Institute
Vladimir Aviation Mechanics College
Vladimir Pedagogical College
Vladimir Polytechnic College
Vladimir Basic Medical College
Vladimir Construction College
Vladimir Regional College of Music
Vladimir Economy and Technology College
Vladimir College of Technology
Vladimir Industrial College
Vladimir Chemical and Mechanical College
College of Innovative Technologies and Entrepreneurship at Vladimir State University
Vladimir is also home to the Federal Centre for Animal Health and Welfare.

Sports
The city association football team, FC Torpedo Vladimir, currently plays in the second tier of Russian football having entered the league after seventeen years of competing in Russian third and fourth tiers.

Vladimir VC (previously known as Skat and Dinamo Vladimir) represents the city in Volleyball Major League B – Zone Europe. Vladimir is also home to Polaris-Vladimir ice hockey club, which competes in regional hockey competitions and Russian minor leagues, and Luch, which has both male and female table-tennis teams.

Twin towns – sister cities

Vladimir is twinned with:

 Anghiari, Italy
 Antalya, Turkey
 Babruysk, Belarus
 Baoji, China
 Bloomington, United States
 Bukhara, Uzbekistan
 Campobasso, Italy
 Canterbury, England, United Kingdom
 Chongqing, China
 Erlangen, Germany
 Gagra, Georgia
 Haikou, China
 Kardzhali, Bulgaria
 Karlovo, Bulgaria
 Kerava, Finland
 Khujand, Tajikistan
 Leninsky (Minsk), Belarus
 Normal, United States
 Saintes, France
 Sarasota, United States
 Skive, Denmark
 Vawkavysk, Belarus

Former twin towns, terminated in 2022 due to the Russian invasion of Ukraine
 Jelenia Góra, Poland
 Ústí nad Labem, Czech Republic

Notable people

Valentin Afonin, association football player
Yuri Lodigin, association football player
Nikolai Andrianov, gymnast
Vladimir Artemov, gymnast
Aleksey Batalov, actor
Mikhail Lazarev, admiral
Yuri Levitan, radio announcer
Anna Loginova, fashion model
Alexey Prokurorov, cross-country skier
Yuri Ryazanov, gymnast
Vasily Shulgin, politician
Mikhail Speransky, statesman
Aleksandr Stoletov, physicist
Nikolai Stoletov, general
Sergei Taneyev, composer
Dmitri Vyazmikin, association football player
Venedikt Yerofeyev, writer
Denis Yevsikov, association football player
Nikolay Zhukovsky, scientist

References

Notes

Sources

Further reading

External links

Tourism portal of the Vladimir region, Russia
Official website of Vladimir  
 
Tourist information on Vladimir
The American Home in Vladimir

 
Golden Ring of Russia
Holy cities
Vladimirsky Uyezd
World Heritage Sites in Russia